Tim Carter (born June 13, 1956) is the former head men's basketball coach at South Carolina State University.  He was previously the head coach at the University of Texas at San Antonio, where he is the all-time winningest coach in the university's history. Carter became the head coach at South Carolina State in 2007, and finished 13-20 in his debut season. He then posted back-to-back winning seasons, and the 2009-10 season reached the MEAC final. In February 2013, Carter abruptly resigned as his team was mired in a 26-game conference losing streak.

College

References

1956 births
Living people
Basketball coaches from Kansas
Florida State Seminoles men's basketball coaches
Houston Cougars men's basketball coaches
Midwestern State Mustangs men's basketball coaches
Northwestern Wildcats men's basketball coaches
Oklahoma Sooners men's basketball coaches
Oklahoma State Cowboys basketball coaches
Omaha Mavericks men's basketball coaches
South Carolina State Bulldogs basketball coaches
University of Kansas alumni 
UTSA Roadrunners men's basketball coaches